Arrabalera  (English language:The Girl from the Suburbs) is a 1950 Argentine musical drama film directed and written by Tulio Demicheli on his debut and starring Tita Merello. It is based on the story by Samuel Eichelbaum. The film premiered on 25 April 1950 in Buenos Aires.

The film is a tango based film, which is an integral part of Argentine culture.

Main cast
Tita Merello
Santiago Gómez Cou
Mario Fortuna
Raúl del Valle
Tito Alonso
Marga López as Rosita
Leticia Scury
Blanca Tapia
Julia Giusti
Juan Pecci
Oscar Soldati
José Pecet
Margarita Burke
Celia Geraldy
Carlos A. Gordillo

References

External links
 

1950 films
1950s Spanish-language films
Tango films
Films directed by Tulio Demicheli
Argentine musical drama films
1950s musical drama films
1950s dance films
Films with screenplays by Tulio Demicheli
1950 directorial debut films
1950 drama films
Argentine black-and-white films
1950s Argentine films